Amboroa is a genus of flowering plants in the family Asteraceae. It is endemic to the highlands of South America. Amboroa was first described as a genus in 1956.

Species
There are only two known species in Amboroa:
 Amboroa geminata Cabrera - Province of Sará in Bolivia
 Amboroa wurdackii R.M.King & H.Rob. - Amazonas and Loreto Regions of Peru

References

Asteraceae genera
Eupatorieae
Flora of South America
Taxa named by Ángel Lulio Cabrera